The  is given annually by the Nikon Salon, an organization of exhibition spaces in Japan that is sponsored by Nikon Corporation.

The award is given to the photographer of what is judged to have been the most outstanding exhibition held in a Nikon Salon within the year running from October through September. As of 2014, the award consists of a statuette, one million yen, and a Nikon D4S camera body and lenses (AF-S NIKKOR 50mm F1.4G).

Recipients

Bibliography
Ina-Nobuo-shō 20nen / Ina Nobuo Award '76-'95. "Nikon Salon Books 23." Tokyo: Nikon, 1996.  An excellently-printed selection of the award-winning works. Text in Japanese only.

External links
Nikon's page about the award (In Japanese). There is a subpage for each year's award.

Awards established in 1976
Japanese awards
Nikon
Photography awards
Photography in Japan